This is a list of pathogens (human or otherwise) in order of size.

See also
 Orders of magnitude (length)

References

Lists of diseases
Lists by length